Peter McDermott (born 11 December 1944) is a former Australian cyclist. He competed in the individual road race and the team time trial events at the 1968 Summer Olympics.

References

External links
 

1944 births
Living people
Australian male cyclists
Olympic cyclists of Australia
Cyclists at the 1968 Summer Olympics
Sportspeople from Geelong